Muddy Creek is a stream in Sullivan, Linn, Grundy and Livingston counties of west central Missouri. It is a tributary of the Grand River.

The stream flow south-southwest passing under Missouri routes 6 and 139 east and south of Humphreys. It passes through the northwest corner of Linn County five miles east of Laredo and the southeast corner of Grundy County. It continues south-southeast into Livingston County then turns south passing 1.5 miles west of Wheeling and under US Route 36.

References

Rivers of Grundy County, Missouri
Rivers of Linn County, Missouri
Rivers of Livingston County, Missouri
Rivers of Sullivan County, Missouri
Tributaries